The Hwaebul Cup (홰불, Torch) is an annual association football competition in men's domestic football in North Korea, organised by the DPR Korea Football Association. The competition is held for Youth Day, 28 August, one of North Korea's major holidays.

Competition format
Beginning in July or August, the competition proceeds in two stages. The first stage consists of the teams divided into two groups playing in a single round-robin basis, with the winner and second-place team of each group advancing to the knockout stage consisting of two semi-final matches and a final, which is played on 28 August of each year.

Venues
All matches are played at one stadium in Pyongyang, which varies year to year. In 2013 the matches were held at the Kim Il-sung Stadium, in 2014 at Yanggakdo Stadium, in 2015 at Rungrado 1st of May Stadium, in 2016 at Sŏsan Stadium, and in 2017 once again at Rungrado Stadium.

List of champions
2013: April 25
2014: April 25
2015: April 25
2016: April 25
2017: Sobaeksu
2018: Ryomyong
2019: Ryomyong
 2022: Rimyongsu

References

The Chosun Jørn: Can Jørn Andersen Make Sense of North Korean Football?

 
Football competitions in North Korea
2013 establishments in North Korea
National association football cups